
Carrera, de la Carrera or Karrera is a surname originated in Venice, Italy. Later, also a Basque surname from Alegría de Oria and Amezketa, in Guipúzcoa (Basque Country, Spain). Other references show that it is also a Castilian surname. There is also evidence that the name originated in Barcelona in Catalonia, in northeastern Spain. And may refer to:

Persons
Asia Carrera (1973–), American porn star
Barbara Carrera (1945–), Nicaraguan-American actress
Carmen Carrera (1985-), American model
Carrera family, Chilean family prominent in the Chilean War of Independence
José Miguel Carrera (1785–1821), hero of the Chilean War of Independence
Luis Carrera (1791–1818), military leader in the Chilean War of Independence
Evelyn Carrera (1971–), Dominican Republic volleyball player
Félix Rigau Carrera (1884–1954), First Puerto Rican aviator
Gonzalo Carrera (contemporary), British rock musician
Ignacio Carrera Pinto (1848–1882), hero of the Chilean Army
Javiera Carrera (1771–1862), hero of the Chilean war of Independence
Juan Ignacio Carrera (1981-), Argentine footballer.
Juan Luis Carrera (contemporary), American musician and recording engineer
Leonardo Carrera (a.k.a. Damián 666) (1961–), Mexican professional wrestler
Leonardo Carrera (a.k.a. Bestia 666) (1989–), Mexican professional wrestler
Martín Carrera (1806–1871), President of Mexico briefly in 1855
Massimo Carrera Italian football player and coach
Norberto Rivera Carrera (1942–), Mexican Roman Catholic archbishop and cardinal
Pietro Carrera (1573–1647), Sicilian chess player, priest, and author
Rafael Carrera (1814–1865), ruler of Guatemala 1839–1865
Sebastián Carrera (1978-), Argentine footballer.
Tia Carrera (1967–), Filipina-American actress
Fernando Carrera (1966–), Minister of Foreign Affairs Guatemala 2013-2014

Fictional characters
Carrera, succubus character from video games Viper GTS
 Kiara “Kie” Carrera, a character in the Netflix series Outer Banks
Sally Carrera, character from the Disney/Pixar film Cars

See also 

 Carriera

References 

Italian-language surnames
Basque-language surnames
Spanish-language surnames